Dibon Forest is a protected forest in Burkina Faso. 
It is located in Tuy Province.

This protected reserve is located at an altitude of about 254 meters.

References

Protected areas of Burkina Faso
Tuy Province